Radical mastectomy is a surgical procedure involving the removal of breast, underlying chest muscle (including pectoralis major and pectoralis minor), and lymph nodes of the axilla as a treatment for breast cancer. Breast cancer is the most common cancer among women today, and used to be primarily treated by surgery, particularly during the early twentieth century when the mastectomy was developed with success. However, with the advancement of technology and surgical skills, the extent of mastectomies has been reduced. Less invasive mastectomies are employed today in comparison to those in the past. Nowadays, a combination of radiotherapy and breast conserving mastectomy are employed to optimize treatment.

Radical mastectomy 

Halsted and Meyer were the first to achieve successful results with the radical mastectomy, thus ushering in the modern era of surgical treatment for breast cancer. In 1894, William Halsted published his work with radical mastectomy from the 50 cases operated at Johns Hopkins between 1889 and 1894. Willy Meyer also published research on radical mastectomy from his interactions with New York patients in December 1894. The en bloc removal of the breast tissue became known as the Halsted mastectomy before adopting the title "the complete operation" and eventually, "the radical mastectomy" as it is known today.

Radical mastectomy was based on the medical belief at the time that breast cancer spread locally at first, invading nearby tissue and then spreading to surrounding lymph ducts where the cells were "trapped". It was thought that hematic spread of tumor cells occurred at a much later stage. Halsted himself believed that cancer spread in a "centrifugal spiral", solidifying this opinion in the medical community at the time.

Radical mastectomy involves removing all the breast tissue, overlying skin, the pectoralis muscles, and all the axillary lymph nodes. Skin was removed because the disease involved the skin, which was often ulcerated. The pectoralis muscles were removed not only because the chest wall was involved, but also because it was thought that removal of the transpectoral lymphatic pathways were necessary. It was also thought, at that time, that it was anatomically impossible to do a complete axillary dissection without removing the pectoralis muscle.

William Halsted accomplished a three-year recurrence rate of 3% and a locoregional recurrence rate of 20% with no perioperative mortality. The five-year survival rate was 40%, which was twice that of untreated patients. However, post-operation morbidity rates were high as the large wounds were left to heal by granulation, lymphedema was  ubiquitous, and arm movement was highly restricted. Thus, chronic pain became a prevalent sequela. Because surgeons were faced with such large breast cancers that seemed to need drastic treatment methods, the quality of patient life was not taken into consideration.

Nonetheless, due to Halsted and Meyer's work, it was possible to cure some cases of breast cancer and knowledge of the disease began to increase. Standardized treatments were created, and controlled long-term studies were conducted. Soon, it became apparent that some women with advanced stages of the disease did not benefit from surgery. In 1943, Haagensen and Stout reviewed over 500 patients who had radical mastectomy for breast cancer and identified a group of patients who could not be cured by radical mastectomy thus developing the concepts of operability and inoperability. The signs of inoperability included ulceration of the skin, fixation to the chest wall, satellite nodules, edema of the skin (peau d'orange), supraclavicular lymph node enlargement, axillary lymph nodes greater than 2.5 cm, or matted, fixed lymph nodes. This contribution of Haagensen and his colleagues would eventually lead to the development of a clinical staging system for breast cancer, the Columbia Clinical Classification, which is a landmark in the study of biology and treatment of breast cancer.

Today, surgeons rarely perform radical mastectomies, as a 1977 study by the National Surgical Adjuvant Breast and Bowel Project (NSABP), led by Bernard Fisher, showed that there was no statistical difference in survival or recurrence between radical mastectomies and less invasive surgeries.

Extended radical mastectomies 
According to the Halsted-Meyer theory, the major pathway for breast cancer dissemination was through the lymphatic ducts. Therefore, it was thought that performing wider and more mutilating surgeries that removed a greater number of lymph nodes would result in greater chances of cure. From 1920 onwards, many surgeons performed surgeries more invasive than the original procedure by Halsted. Sampson Handley noted Halsted's observation of the existence of malignant metastasis to the chest wall and breast bone via the chain of internal mammary nodes under the sternum and employed an "extended" radical mastectomy that included the removal of the lymph nodes located there and the implantation of radium needles into the anterior intercostal spaces. This line of study was extended by his son, Richard S. Handley, who studied internal mammary chain nodal involvement in breast cancer and demonstrated that 33% of 150 breast cancer patients had internal mammary chain involvement at the time of surgery. The radical mastectomy was subsequently extended by a number of surgeons such as Sugarbaker and Urban to include removal of internal mammary lymph nodes. Eventually, this "extended" radical mastectomy was extended even further to include removal of the supraclavicular lymph nodes at the time of mastectomy by Dahl-Iversen and Tobiassen. Some surgeons like Prudente even went as far as amputating the upper arm en bloc with the mastectomy specimen in an attempt to cure relatively advanced local disease. This increasingly radical progression culminated in the ‘super-radical’ mastectomy which consisted of complete excision of all breast tissue, axillary content, removal of the latissimus dorsi, pectoralis major and minor muscles and dissection of the internal mammary lymph nodes. After retrospective analysis, the extended radical mastectomies were abandoned as these massive and disabling operations proved to be not superior to those of the standard radical mastectomies.

References

Breast surgery
Surgical oncology
Surgical removal procedures